Ethical extensionism is an argument in environmental ethics that moral standing ought to be extended to things (animals, plants, species, the earth) that traditionally are not thought of as having moral standing.

For example, while many cultures differ as to what, exactly, is "murder", all cultures take it as wrong to commit murder. An example of ethical extensionism would be to extend to dogs or cats the status of being something that can be murdered, so that it would be wrong under some circumstances to kill a dog or cat.

On the one hand, ethical extensionism is a broadening of the class of things to which humans may owe an ethical duty.

But Des Jardins makes the point that most ethical extensionism has been merely broadening the ethical sphere incrementally, a process not agreeable to some environmental ethicists who would prefer more of a total replacement of traditional ethics with an entirely new approach. So, while ethical extensionism can, in principle, broaden the sphere of ethical standing to any arbitrary limits, the extensionist approach is seen by more recent ethical theorists as being inadequate.

References
 Des Jardins, J. R. (2006). Environmental ethics: An introduction to environmental philosophy (4th ed.). Belmont, CA: Wadsworth Publishing Company.

Environmental ethics